Although Baltimore is only a 45-minute drive northeast of Washington, D.C., it is a major media market in its own right. Its main newspaper, The Baltimore Sun, was sold by its Baltimore owners in 1986 to the Times Mirror Company, which was bought by the Tribune Company in 2000. Baltimore is the 24th largest television market and 21st largest radio market in the country.

Newspapers

Baltimore Afro-American
Baltimore Beat
Baltimore Business Journal
Baltimore Jewish Times
Baltimore Out Loud
The Baltimore Sun
The Daily Record
Gay Life
The UB Post
The Towerlight
The Johns Hopkins News-Letter

Defunct newspapers
Baltimore City Paper
The Baltimore Examiner
Baltimore Daily Commercial (1865–1867)
The Baltimore Guide
Baltimore Morning Herald
Baltimore News-American
Baltimore Wecker
The Catholic Mirror
Herald of Freedom and Torch Light
Telegraf

Television
The Baltimore television market includes the city and ten counties in northeastern Maryland. Due to Baltimore's proximity to Washington, D.C., local viewers can also receive the signal of most television stations broadcasting in the Washington television market.

The following is a list of television stations licensed to and/or broadcasting from Baltimore, with network owned-and-operated stations highlighted in bold:

Other stations broadcasting from the greater Baltimore Metropolitan Area include:  WMJF-CD, an Ion Television affiliate which transmits from  Towson University in Towson, Maryland; and WQAW-LD, an Azteca affiliate in Lake Shore, Maryland.

Cable channels based in the Baltimore area include:

 Mid-Atlantic Sports Network
 Public, educational, and government access (PEG) channels
 Public-access television, channel 75
 Educational-access television, channel 76
 Government-access television (GATV), channel 25

Radio

 WBAL
 WBJC
 WEAA
 WERQ
 WIYY
 WJZ
 WJZ-FM
 WLIF
 WLOY
 WNST
 WPOC
 WQSR
 WRBS
 WWIN (AM)
 WWIN-FM
 WWMX
 WYPR
 WCAO
 WCBM
 WZBA
 WZFT

Magazines
 Baltimore magazine
 Baltimore SmartCEO
 Inside Lacrosse
 Grub Street (literary magazine)
 32 Poems
 Welter
 Smartish Pace
 Where What When
 The Wine Advocate
 B Woman

Defunct magazines
 Baltimore Saturday Visiter
 The Portico
 The Accountant and Advertiser
 Rural Gentleman and Ladies' Companion
 The Southern Review
 Dirty Linen

Other
 Baltimore Banner
 Baltimore Brew
 Baltimore Fishbowl
 The Real News Network
 Technical.ly Baltimore
 Wide Angle Youth Media

See also
 Ethnic press in Baltimore
 Media in Washington, D.C.
 Maryland media
 List of newspapers in Maryland
 List of radio stations in Maryland
 List of television stations in Maryland
 Media of locales in Maryland: College Park, Cumberland, Frederick, Gaithersburg

References

External links
Baltimore, MD on American Radio Map (Radiomap.us)

Baltimore
Mass media in Maryland